This is a list of the wild animal species that were reported in Egypt.

Class: Mammalia (mammals)

Order: Tubulidentata (aardvarks)

Family: Orycteropodidae 
Genus: Orycteropus 
Aardvark (orycteropus afer)

Order: Hyracoidea (hyraxes)

Family: Procaviidae (hyraxes) 
Genus: Procavia 
Rock hyrax (procavia capensis)

Order: Sirenia (manatees and dugongs)

Family: Dugongidae 
Genus: Dugong 
Dugong (dugong dugon)

 
 
 
 
 
 
 
 
 
 
 
 
 
 
 
 
 
 
 

Order: Rodentia (rodents)

Family: Gliridae (dormice) 
Genus: Eliomys 
Asian garden dormouse (eliomys melanurus)
Family: Dipodidae (jerboas) 
Genus: Allactaga 
Four-toed jerboa (allactaga tetradactyla)

Genus: Jaculus 
Lesser Egyptian jerboa (jaculus jaculus) 
Greater Egyptian jerboa (jaculus orientalis) 

Family: Spalacidae 
Genus: Nannospalax 
Middle East blind mole-rat (nannospalax ehrenbergi) 

Family: Muridae (mice, rats, voles, gerbils, hamsters etc.) 
Genus: Acomys 
Cairo spiny mouse (acomys cahirinus) 
Golden spiny mouse (acomys russatus) 

Genus: Dipodillus 
North African gerbil (dipodillus campestris) 
Mackilligin's gerbil (dipodillus mackilligini) 

Genus: Gerbillus 
Pleasant gerbil (gerbillus amoenus) 
Anderson's gerbil (gerbillus andersoni) 
Flower's gerbil (gerbillus floweri) 
Lesser Egyptian gerbil (gerbillus gerbillus) 
Pygmy gerbil (gerbillus henleyi) 
Pale gerbil (gerbillus perpallidus) 
Greater Egyptian gerbil (gerbillus pyramidum) 
Lesser short-tailed gerbil (gerbillus simoni) 

Genus: Meriones 
Sundevall's jird (meriones crassus) 
Libyan jird (meriones lybicus) 
Shaw's jird (meriones shawi) 

Genus: Pachyuromys 
Fat-tailed gerbil (pachyuromys duprasi) 

Genus: Psammomys 
Fat sand rat (psammomys obesus) 

Genus: Sekeetamys 
Bushy-tailed jird (sekeetamys calurus) 

Genus: Arvicanthis 
African grass rat (arvicanthis niloticus) 

Genus: Nesokia 
Short-tailed bandicoot rat (nesokia indica)

 

Order: Lagomporpha (lagomorphs) 
Family: Leporidae (rabbits, hares) 
Genus: Lepus 
Cape hare (lepus capensis) 

 

Order: Erinaceomorpha (hedgehogs and gymnures) 

Family: Erinaceidae (hedgehogs) 
Genus: Hemiechinus 
Long-eared hedgehog (hemiechinus auritus) 
Genus: Paraechinus 
Desert hedgehog (paraechinus aethiopicus) 

Order: Eulipotyphla (shrews,moles and solenodons) 

Family: Soricidae (shrews) 
Genus: Crocidura 
African giant shrew (crocidura olivieri)

wild animals